Kuttan Pillai Rajmohan Unnithan (born 10 June 1953) is an Indian film actor turned politician who is a member in the Lok Sabha representing Kasaragod constituency and a member of the Indian National Congress. 

He was a spokesperson to the Kerala Pradesh Congress Committee (KPCC), the Kerala body of the Indian National Congress. Unnithan won from Kasaragod constituency with a margin of 40438 against Communist Party of India (Marxist) candidate K. P. Satheesh Chandran in 2019 general election. He portrayed some political characters in Malayalam movies also. The Tiger (2005) is his debut movie.

Film career 
During his college days, he was a part of professional as well as amateur plays and theatre. But he did not pursue a career in acting later on although he portrayed some political characters in Malayalam movies. The Tiger (2005) starring Suresh Gopi was his debut movie.

Political career

Filmography

External links

References

India MPs 2019–present
Lok Sabha members from Kerala
Living people
Indian National Congress politicians from Kerala
Politicians from Kollam
1956 births